Rose Rollins (born April 30, 1981) is an American actress. She is known for her role as Tasha Williams in the Showtime drama series, The L Word (2007–09) and as Valerie Anderson in the ABC crime drama series, The Catch (2016–17).

Early life
Rollins was born in Berkeley, California. She moved to New York when she worked as model, appearing on numerous commercials and major advertising campaigns. She later moved to Los Angeles, and made her acting debut appearing as C. J. Cregg's assistant in two episodes of NBC drama series, The West Wing in 1999.

Career
In early 2000s, Rollins has had supporting roles in films 13 Moons (2002) opposite Jennifer Beals, Undisputed (2002) starring Wesley Snipes, and Something New (2006) starring Sanaa Lathan. She also appeared in Mission: Impossible III in 2006.  On television, she had the recurring role in the short-lived ABC legal drama In Justice in 2006.

In 2007, Rollins joined the cast of the Showtime drama series The L Word during the fourth season as Tasha Williams. She starred on the show through the finale in 2009. She also played Monique on the web series Girltrash! in 2007, which was directed by Angela Robinson. She later has appeared on CSI: NY and Miami Medical, before a regular role opposite  Kelli Giddish in the short-lived NBC police drama series, Chase produced by Jerry Bruckheimer during 2010–11 season. In 2014, Rollins played the leading role alongside Julia Stiles in the TNT legal drama pilot Guilt by Association.

In 2015, Rollins had a recurring role as Detective Kizmin Rider in the Amazon crime drama series, Bosch. Later that year, she was cast as Valerie Anderson in the ABC drama series The Catch produced by Shonda Rhimes. The series was canceled after two seasons. She later went to co-star on the second season of the Audience Network thriller Condor.

Filmography

Film

Television

Web

References

External links

1981 births
Living people
Actresses from Los Angeles
American television actresses
Actresses from Berkeley, California
People from Yonkers, New York
African-American actresses
American film actresses
21st-century American actresses
21st-century African-American women
21st-century African-American people
20th-century African-American people
20th-century African-American women